The Constitutio domus regis (or Establishment of the King's Household), was a handbook written around 1136 that discussed the running of the household of King Henry I of England, as it was in the last years of Henry's reign. It was probably written for the new king, Stephen. It gives what every officer and member of the household should be paid, what other allowances they should be given, as well as listing all offices in the household. It is likely that the author of the work was Nigel who was treasurer under Henry I and became Bishop of Ely in 1133, although this is not accepted by all historians.

The Constitutio lists the offices and officers in three main grades. The first consists of the chancellor, the stewards, master butler and chamberlain, and the constables. The Treasury, or Exchequer, was already separate from the household of the king by the time the document was composed; for, although the head of the treasury, the Treasurer, was listed in the document, the rest of the treasury officials are not covered. It covers the whole of the domus regis, or household of the king.

It isn't until the Household Ordinances of 12 November 1279 that another document regulating the king's household survives.

References

Sources

Further reading

 

English non-fiction literature
Latin historical texts from Norman and Angevin England